Team Mendelspeck is an Italian women's road cycling team that was founded in 2019, before registering with the UCI for the 2022 season.

References

Cycling teams based in Italy
Cycling teams established in 2019